The year 1563 in science and technology included a number of events, some of which are listed here.

Medicine and physiology
 June–October – Outbreak of bubonic plague in London kills over 20,000.
 Bartolomeo Eustachi publishes De Renibus (including his discovery of the adrenal glands) and Libellus De Dentibus (in Venice), a pioneering text on dentition.
 Garcia de Orta publishes Colóquios dos simples e drogas da India in Goa, the first text in a Western language on tropical medicine and drugs, including a classic description of cholera.
 Felix Würtz publishes his critical treatise on surgery, Praktika der Wundartzney, in Basel.

Publications
 prob. date – Bernardino Telesio – De Rerum Natura Iuxta Propria Principia.

Births
 October 14 – Jodocus Hondius, Flemish cartographer (died 1612)
 Louise Bourgeois Boursier, French Royal midwife (died 1638)
 Yi Su-gwang, Korean scholar-bureaucrat (died 1628)
 Walter Warner, English scientist (died 1643)
 approx. date
 Oswald Croll, German iatrochemist (died 1609)
 William Lee, English inventor (died 1614)

Deaths

References

 
16th century in science
1560s in science